The Barbados threadsnake (Tetracheilostoma carlae) is a species of threadsnake. It is the smallest known snake species. This member of the Leptotyphlopidae family is found on the Caribbean islands of Barbados and Anguilla.

Taxonomy and etymology
The Barbados threadsnake was first identified as a separate species in 2008 by S. Blair Hedges, a herpetologist from Pennsylvania State University. Hedges named the new species of snake in honor of his wife, Carla Ann Hass, a herpetologist who was part of the discovery team. Specimens already existed in reference collections in the London Natural History Museum and in a museum in California, but they had been incorrectly identified to belong to another species.

At the time of publication, August 2008, T. carlae was described as the snake species with the smallest adults in the world. The first scientific specimens taken by the research team were found under rocks in a forest. The snake is thought to be near the lower size limit for snakes, as young snakes need to attain a certain minimum size to find suitable food.

Description

The average total length (including tail)  of T. carlae adults is approximately 10 cm (3.94 inches), with the largest specimen found to date measuring 10.4 cm (4.09 inches) in total length. The snake is said by Hedges to be "about as wide as a spaghetti noodle." The photograph above shows L. carlae on a quarter dollar, a coin with a diameter of 24.26 mm (0.955 inches).  The specimen weighed 0.6 grams.

Diet
T. carlae is thought to feed primarily on a diet of termites and ant larvae.

Reproduction
Threadsnakes (Leptotyphlopidae) are oviparous, laying eggs to reproduce.  The female of this snake species, T. carlae, produces only one large egg at a time. The emerging offspring is about half the length of the mother.

Small species of snakes such as T. carlae have relatively large new-born offspring compared to adults. The offspring of the largest snakes are only one-tenth the length of an adult, whereas offspring of the smallest snakes typically are one-half the length of an adult (see figure). The tiny snakes produce only one, massive egg – relative to the size of the mother.

Conservation status
Little is known about the ecology, abundance, or distribution of this species, T. carlae. Essentially, Barbados has no original forest remaining, however, this native species very likely requires a forest habitat for survival since it evolved in the presence of forests. Based on the small number of known specimens and its distribution apparently being restricted to eastern Barbados, the continued survival of the species is a concern.

See also
Smallest organisms

References

External links
.

Leptotyphlopidae
Reptiles described in 2008
Taxa named by Stephen Blair Hedges
Snakes of the Caribbean
Reptiles of Barbados
Endemic fauna of Barbados
Tetracheilostoma